Bradford Freeman may refer to:

Bradford C. Freeman, American soldier, the last survivor of Easy Company of the 101st Airborne Division
Bradford M. Freeman, American businessman and conservative political fundraiser